Tony Cal Bishop Jr. (born July 16, 1989) is an American-born Panamanian professional basketball player. He played college basketball for Texas State University.

Professional career
Bishop went undrafted in the 2011 NBA draft. On September 16, 2011, he signed a one-year deal with the Aalborg Vikings of the Danish Basketball League.

On September 4, 2012, Bishop signed a one-year deal with BC Nevėžis of the Lithuanian Basketball League.

On November 1, 2013, Bishop was selected by the Rio Grande Valley Vipers in the second round of the 2013 NBA Development League Draft. On November 2, 2014, he was reacquired by the Vipers. In April 2015, after the end of the 2014–15 D-League season, he signed with Atléticos de San Germán of Puerto Rico for the rest of the 2015 BSN season.

On July 22, 2015, he signed with Eisbären Bremerhaven of the Basketball Bundesliga. On January 21, 2016, he parted ways with Bremerhaven. Five days later, he signed with the Atléticos de San Germán, returning for a second stint.

Bishop joined the Meralco Bolts of the Philippine Basketball Association in November 2021 as the team's import or foreign player for the 2021 PBA Governors' Cup. On December 22, he scored 36 points in a 83–80 victory over against the TNT Tropang Giga.

On September 30, 2022, Bishop signed with the Taichung Suns of the T1 League. On January 13, 2023, Taichung Suns terminated Bishop's contract.

References

External links
Eurobasket.com profile
FIBA.com profile
Texas State bio

1989 births
Living people
American expatriate basketball people in Denmark
American expatriate basketball people in Germany
American expatriate basketball people in Japan
American expatriate basketball people in Lithuania
American expatriate basketball people in the Philippines
American expatriate basketball people in Poland
American expatriate basketball people in Romania
American men's basketball players
Atléticos de San Germán players
Bakken Bears players
Basketball players from Dallas
BC Nevėžis players
CSU Pitești players
Eisbären Bremerhaven players
Junior college men's basketball players in the United States
Meralco Bolts players
Kanazawa Samuraiz players
Panamanian expatriate sportspeople in Romania
Panamanian men's basketball players
Philippine Basketball Association imports
Power forwards (basketball)
Rio Grande Valley Vipers players
Small forwards
Texas State Bobcats men's basketball players
Taichung Suns players
T1 League imports
American expatriate basketball people in Taiwan